The 1950 Roller Hockey World Cup was the sixth roller hockey world cup, organized by the Fédération Internationale de Patinage a Roulettes (now under the name of Fédération Internationale de Roller Sports). It was contested by 10 national teams (9 from Europe and 1 from Africa) and it is also considered the 1950 European Roller Hockey Championship (despite the presence of Egypt). All the games were played in the city of Milan, in Italy, the chosen city to host the World Cup. It was the first edition decided in a final game, which saw Portugal defeating Italy by 4–0.

Results

Standings

Final

See also
FIRS Roller Hockey World Cup
CERH European Roller Hockey Championship

External links
1950 World Cup in rink-hockey.net historical database

1950
World Cup,1950
1950 in Italian sport
World Cup
Sports competitions in Milan